"(When You Gonna) Give It Up to Me" (known as "Give It Up to Me" in its solo version) is a song written by Jamaican rapper Sean Paul for his third album, The Trinity (2005). The single meant to be released after "Temperature" was "Breakout" but was switched to "Give It Up to Me" to promote the film Step Up (2006). It was the fourth US single to be taken from the album and the fifth UK single. The version released as a single ("(When You Gonna) Give It Up to Me") is a collaboration with Keyshia Cole and is from the Step Up film soundtrack. Despite The Trinity being re-released just before the single release, the version with Keyshia Cole does not appear on the album despite a "radio version" being added.

The solo version was released in the US on 6 June 2006 while the version with Cole was released two weeks later, on 20 June. It was later issued as a commercial single in Australia and the United Kingdom in October 2006. "(When You Gonna) Give It Up to Me" climbed to number three on the US Billboard Hot 100 chart upon its release, becoming Paul's sixth top-10 hit and Cole's first top-10 hit. Internationally, the song became a top-20 hit in Australia, the Czech Republic, Finland, Switzerland, and the Wallonia region of Belgium.

Music video
The video was directed by Little X and filmed in a gym, which the director describes as "fun and exciting." Sean Paul and Keyshia Cole dance throughout the video, usually separate, and with their own dancers. Around the middle of the video, the three stars of the new dance film, Step Up, Channing Tatum, Jenna Dewan, Drew Sidora appear. Jon Cruz and Rufino Puno of Super Cr3w, from America's Best Dance Crew (Season 2) can be seen late in the video breakdancing.

Track listings
US CD single
 "(When You Gonna) Give It Up to Me" (featuring Keyshia Cole) [radio version]
 "(When You Gonna) Give It Up to Me" [instrumental]

UK CD single
 "(When You Gonna) Give It Up to Me" (featuring Keyshia Cole) [radio version]
 "Get Busy" [Sessions at AOL version]

UK 12-inch single
 "(When You Gonna) Give It Up to Me" (featuring Keyshia Cole) [radio version]
 "(When You Gonna) Give It Up to Me" [instrumental]
 "Like Glue" [video mix]
 "Get Busy" (featuring Fatman Scoop & Crooklyn Clan) [Clap Your Hands Now remix - street club long version]

Charts

Weekly charts

Year-end charts

Certifications

Release history

References

External links
 

Sean Paul songs
Keyshia Cole songs
2005 songs
2006 singles
Atlantic Records singles
Music videos directed by Benny Boom
Music videos directed by Director X
Songs written by Sean Paul
VP Records singles